Svetlio & the Legends, also referred to as Svetlio Hipodilski i Legendite, is a Bulgarian alternative rock band, formed in 2007 by former members of Hipodil.

History 
Hipodil broke up in 2004, but still played gigs. In 2006, at a concert at Zimen dvorec in Sofia, Hipodil played alongside Revyu and Upsurt. They debuted a new song entitled "Let Me Da Te Love You", which used a mixed form of Bulgarian and English words.

In 2007, Svetlio and the Legends released their debut album, Bulgarno in 2007. The album stated it contained 10 tracks, however only nine were released, because track 5, "Povarhnostni rani" (Повърхностни рани, Running Wounds) was said to have been plagiarised from an Italian pop song. The track "Let Me Da Te Love You" was on it, and it became a big hit. A music video was filmed for it.

In 2008, the video for "Povarhnostni rani" was released, however the beginning and end of the song were faded out.

In 2011, the band released their second album IBAN. It contained the hit "Boli me gaza" (Боли ме гъза, My Ass Hurts), the full version of "Povarhnostni rani" (by then renamed "Fani"), two versions of the track "CMR/ЧМР" (Chalga Metal Rock/Чалга Метъл Рок) and a track called "Rambo Silek" (Рамбо Силек), which according to Svetlio was intended for Hipodil's ill-fated sixth album Aa, Bb, Vv, Gg, Zz.... That year, Svetoslav Vitkov and Vencislav Micov were nominated for president and vice president in the 2011 Bulgarian elections.

In 2012, they released a music video for a song called "Mitko" (Митко) (also known as "Dimitrich/Димитрич").

On 27 March 2015, they played their first gig in the English-speaking world at the 100 Club in London.

Members 
 Svetoslav Vitkov - vocals
 Vladimir Mitin - trumpet
 Aleksandar Borisov - trombone
 Borislav Rashkov - bass
 Petar Aleksandrov - drums, percussion
 Ivan Mechkarov - accordion (since 2010)
 Nikolai Dobrev - Mani - guitar (since 2010)

Former members 
 Chadar Vulchev - guitar (until 2010)
 Vencislav Micov - keyboards, programming, arrangements (until 2010)

Discography 
 Bulgarno (2007)
 IBAN (2011)

External links 
 Svetlio Vitkov's official website
 Svetlio & the Legends at Bulgarian Rock Archives

Musical groups established in 2007
Bulgarian rock music groups
Culture in Sofia